Bangabari Union is one of the nine union parishod of Gomostapur Upazila in Bangladesh. It has an area of 14.70 km2 and a population at the 2011 Census of 30,288 (preliminary figures). Bangabari Union consists of 19 villages. It has an excellent road communication infrastructure. The union porishod office of Bangabari Union is only three-four hours road journey away from Rajshahi Division, the divisional city.

Geography
The famous Mohannad river borders Bangabari Union on the south and in the West. Bangabari Union shares a border with India.

Infrastructure

Communications

Bangabari Union is served by major cellular networks. Phones are available for making calls. Internet services are available, though the data bandwidth is poor.

Health facilities
There is a small public health facility in the village with a doctor and first aid support.

Education
Bangabari Union has a low literacy rate, estimated at 49% in 2013. There are a number of educational facilities around Bangabari, these include
 Government Primary School: 14
 High School: 5 
 Higher Secondary (College): 1
 Technical School: 1
 Religious School: 3

Languages
The local people speaks Bangla. Bangla and English languages are taught in the schools and the educated part of the population can understand and speak in English.

See also
 Gomostapur Upazila
 List of villages in Bangladesh
 Nawabganj District

References

Rajshahi Division
Unions of Gomostapur Upazila